The original member states of the World Trade Organization are the parties to the General Agreement on Tariffs and Trade (GATT) after ratifying the Uruguay Round Agreements, and the European Communities. They obtained this status at the entry into force on 1 January 1995 or upon their date of ratification. All other members have joined the organization as a result of negotiation, and membership consists of a balance of rights and obligations. The process of becoming a World Trade Organization (WTO) member is unique to each applicant country, and the terms of accession are dependent upon the country's stage of economic development and the current trade regime.

An offer of accession is given once consensus is reached among members. The process takes about five years, on average, but it can take some countries almost a decade if the country is less than fully committed to the process, or if political issues interfere. The shortest accession negotiation was that of Kyrgyzstan, lasting 2 years and 10 months. The longest were that of Russia, lasting 19 years and 2 months, Vanuatu, lasting 17 years and 1 month, and China, lasting 15 years and 5 months.

As of 2007, WTO member states represented 96.4% of global trade and 96.7% of global GDP. Iran, followed by Algeria, are the economies with the largest GDP and trade outside the WTO, using 2005 data.

Accession process

A country wishing to accede to the WTO submits an application to the General Council. The government applying for membership has to describe all aspects of its trade and economic policies that have a bearing on WTO agreements. The application is submitted to the WTO in a memorandum which is examined by a working party open to all interested WTO Members, and dealing with the country's application. For large countries such as Russia, numerous countries participate in this process. For smaller countries, the Quadrilateral group of members—consisting of Canada, the European Union, Japan, and the United States—and an applicant's neighboring countries are typically most involved. The applicant then presents a detailed memorandum to the Working Party on its foreign trade regime, describing, among other things, its economy, economic policies, domestic and international trade regulations, and intellectual property policies. The Working Party Members submit written questions to the applicant to clarify aspects of its foreign trade regime with particular attention being paid to the degree of privatization in the economy and the extent to which government regulation is transparent. After all necessary background information has been acquired, the Working Party will begin meeting to focus on issues of discrepancy between the WTO rules and the Applicant's international and domestic trade policies and laws. The WP determines the terms and conditions of entry into the WTO for the applicant nation, and may consider transitional periods to allow countries some leeway in complying with the WTO rules.

The final phase of accession involves bilateral negotiations between the applicant nation and other Working Party members regarding the concessions and commitments on tariff levels and market access for goods and services. These talks cover tariff rates and specific market access commitments, and other policies in goods and services. The new member's commitments are to apply equally to all WTO members under normal non-discrimination rules, even though they are negotiated bilaterally. In other words, the talks determine the benefits (in the form of export opportunities and guarantees) other WTO members can expect when the new member joins. The talks can be highly complicated; it has been said that in some cases the negotiations are almost as large as an entire round of multilateral trade negotiations.

When the bilateral talks conclude, the working party finalizes the terms of accession, sends an accession package, which includes a summary of all the WP meetings, the Protocol of Accession (a draft membership treaty), and lists ("schedules") of the member-to-be's commitments to the General Council or Ministerial Conference. Once the General Council or Ministerial Conference approves of the terms of accession, the applicant's parliament must ratify the Protocol of Accession before it can become a member. The documents used in the accession process which are embargoed during the accession process are released once the nation becomes a member.

Members and observers

As of July 2016, the WTO has 164 members. Of the 128 states party to GATT at the end of 1994, all have since become WTO members except for the Socialist Federal Republic of Yugoslavia, which had dissolved in 1992 and was suspended from participating in GATT at the time. Four other states, China, Lebanon, Liberia, and Syria, were parties to GATT but subsequently withdrew from the treaty prior to the establishment of the WTO. China and Liberia have since acceded to the WTO. The remaining WTO members acceded after first becoming WTO observers and negotiating membership.

The 27 states of the European Union are dually represented, as the EU is a full member of the organization. Other autonomous entities are eligible for full membership in the WTO provided that they have a separate customs territory with full autonomy in the conduct of their external commercial relations. Thus, Hong Kong became a GATT contracting party, by the now terminated "sponsorship" procedure of the United Kingdom (Hong Kong uses the name "Hong Kong, China" since 1997), as did Macao. A new member of this type is the Republic of China (Taiwan), which acceded to the WTO in 2002, and carefully crafted its application by joining under the name "Separate Customs Territory of Taiwan, Penghu, Kinmen and Matsu (Chinese Taipei)" so that they were not rejected as a result of the One China principle implemented by the People's Republic of China.

The WTO also has 24 observer states, that with the exception of the Holy See must start their accession negotiations within five years of becoming observers. The last country admitted as observer-only before applying for full membership was Equatorial Guinea in 2002, but since 2007 it is also in full membership negotiations. In 2007 Liberia and Comoros applied directly for full membership.  Some international intergovernmental organizations are also granted observer status to WTO bodies. The Palestinian Authority submitted a request for WTO observer status in October 2009 and again in April 2010.

Afghanistan is the newest member, joining effective 29 July 2016.

Russia was one of the only two large economies outside of the WTO after Saudi Arabia joined in 2005. It had begun negotiating to join the WTO's predecessor in 1993. The final major point of contention—related to the 2008 Russo-Georgian War—was solved through mediation by Switzerland, leading to Russian membership in 2012. The other is Iran, which is an observer state and begun negotiations in 1996.

List of members and accession dates
The following table lists all current members, their accession date and previous GATT membership, of which there were 128 nations when the transformation was consummated.

Notes

List of observers
The following table lists all 25 WTO observers. Within five years of being granted observer status by the WTO, states are required to begin negotiating their accession to the organization.

Notes

Neither members nor observers
The following table lists all the UN member states and UN General Assembly observer states which are neither members nor observers of the WTO.

 
 
 
 
 
 
 
 
 
 
 

Additionally,  has expressed an interest in joining the WTO.

Notes

See also
 List of customs territories

References

Bibliography and Web

World Trade Organization
World Trade Organization
World Trade Organization